Yuri Andreyevich Kolokolnikov (born 15 December 1980) is a Russian stage and film actor. In the West, Kolokolnikov is best known for his performance as Styr in the television series Game of Thrones and as Gennadi Bystrov in The Americans.

Early life
Yuri Kolokolnikov was born in Moscow, Russian SFSR, Soviet Union. His parents divorced shortly after Yuri was born and in 1985 his mother moved to Canada with Yuri and his brother. Kolokolnikov is a citizen of Russia and Canada.

According to most, Kolokolnikov as a child, was both unruly and uncontrollable. Unable to cope with the upbringing of her son, his mother sent him back to Russia to live with his father.

Almost immediately after his arrival in Moscow, he went to study at film school and became involved with the production of children shows. Soon afterwards, his father took him to audition for the director Savva Kulish, where Kolokolnikov gained a small role in the film Iron Curtain.

At 15 years old, he passed external exams for the last two classes of high school and submitted his documents to the Boris Shchukin Theatre Institute.

In 2000, immediately after graduation, he went to Hollywood. During the year, he lived in Los Angeles and New York, working part-time as a waiter, a courier, a loader. Unable to break into the big cinema Kolokolnikov returned to Moscow.

In 2013, he dictated the text of the annual educational action "Total dictation" on the MSU Faculty of Journalism.

Career
He has appeared in more than forty films since 1998. Kolokolnikov met with director Kirill Serebrennikov, who invited him for a role in the television series Diary of a Killer in the staging of Sweet Bird of Youth at the theater Sovremennik Theatre. The premiere took place in 2002.

In 2014, he played the role of Styr, Magnar of Thenn, in the fourth season of the television series Game of Thrones.

He had a lead role in the Russian 2016 comedy film Breakfast with Daddy. The film is about a wealthy man who discovers that he has a 10 year old daughter.

In the 2017 American action-comedy The Hitman's Bodyguard, Kolokolnikov played a Belarusian mercenary leader Ivan.

Personal life
Kolokolnikov has a daughter Taisia, born in 2006. His life partner was actress Kseniya Rappoport until 2014. From this relationship, Yuri has a daughter named Sofia, born in January 2011.

Selected filmography

Awards
 Scholarship prize of business circles "Kumir-1999"
 Laureate of the Theatrical Prize "Chaika" 2003
 Laureate of the Youth Prize "Triumph" 2004

References

External links 

 

1980 births
Living people
Russian male film actors
Russian male television actors
Russian male stage actors
20th-century Russian male actors
21st-century Russian male actors
Male actors from Moscow
Russian film producers